Paxton Jones Pomykal (born December 17, 1999) is an American professional soccer player who plays as a midfielder for Major League Soccer club FC Dallas.

Early life 
Pomykal was born in Lewisville, Texas, on December 17, 1999. He attended iUniversity Prep, a Grapevine Colleyville ISD Virtual Academy in Grapevine, TX. He also attended Marcus High School.

Club career

Youth 
Pomykal began his career with FC Dallas' youth academy, where he played with the team in the U.S. Development Academy. He was part of the FC Dallas' U-16 and U-18 teams that won National Youth Championships.

Professional 
Pomykal signed a homegrown contract with FC Dallas on September 8, 2016. He made his professional debut on March 1, 2017, in a 2016–17 CONCACAF Champions League quarterfinal match against Árabe Unido. Pomykal came on in the 63rd minute for Kellyn Acosta.  On Saturday, March 30 Pomykal scored his 1st and 2nd MLS goals against Salt Lake City. For his good form throughout the early part of the season, Pomykal was named to the 2019 MLS All Star game alongside club teammate Matt Hedges.

In the first game of the 2020 season, Pomykal scored the insurance goal in a 2–0 win over the Philadelphia Union.

International career 
He played for the United States U-18 team at the 2016 Vaclav Jezek Tournament. He consistently started for the US U20s at the 2019 FIFA U-20 World Cup in Poland.

Pomykal earned much praise through the 2019 MLS season that led to his first senior team call up in September. He made his first appearance for the USMNT on September 10, 2019 in an international friendly against Uruguay as a late substitute. Pomykal would also be called up and started for a friendly match against Serbia in 2023 which the United States lost 2-1.

Career statistics

Club

International

Honors 
United States U20
CONCACAF U-20 Championship: 2018

Individual
MLS All-Star: 2019

References

External links 
FC Dallas Profile

1999 births
Living people
American soccer players
Association football midfielders
Homegrown Players (MLS)
FC Dallas players
Major League Soccer players
People from Lewisville, Texas
Soccer players from Texas
Sportspeople from the Dallas–Fort Worth metroplex
United States men's youth international soccer players
United States men's under-20 international soccer players
United States men's international soccer players